The Night That Panicked America is an American made-for-television drama film that was originally broadcast on the ABC network on October 31, 1975. The telefilm dramatizes events surrounding Orson Welles' famous - and infamous - War of the Worlds radio broadcast (based on the 1898 novel of the same name by English author H. G. Wells) of October 30, 1938, which had led some Americans to believe that an invasion by Martians was occurring in the area near Grover's Mill in West Windsor, New Jersey.

The Welles broadcast and the reaction to it had been earlier dramatized on television as The Night America Trembled, a live presentation that aired September 9, 1957, on Studio One.

Plot
The Night That Panicked America tells the story of the 1938 broadcast from the point of view of Welles and his associates as they create the broadcast live, as well as from the points of view of a number of different fictional American families, in a variety of locations and from a variety of social classes, who listened to the broadcast and believed the imaginary Martian invasion was actually occurring, with some people even committing suicide.

Cast
 Paul Shenar as Orson Welles
 Vic Morrow as Hank Muldoon, Ann's husband
 Eileen Brennan as Ann Muldoon, Hank's wife
 Cliff DeYoung as Stefan Grubowski
 Michael Constantine as Jess Wingate, Walter's father
 John Ritter as Walter Wingate, Jess' son
 Walter McGinn as Paul Stewart
 Will Geer as Reverend Davis, Linda's father
 Meredith Baxter as Linda Davis, the Reverend's daughter
 Tom Bosley as Norman Smith
 Casey Kasem as Mercury Theatre player

Reception
The Encyclopedia of Science Fiction praised the film's recreation of events in the radio studio, but was unimpressed by its depiction of the resulting panic, calling it "a routine disaster movie with hackneyed characters reacting in predictable ways." Through the 1980s, some local stations in various areas of the United States made an annual tradition of rebroadcasting Night on October 30 (the anniversary of the original radio broadcast) or on October 31 (Halloween).

The movie received three Emmy Award nominations, winning for Outstanding Achievement in Film Sound Editing – For a Single Episode of a Regular or Limited Series in 1976.

Home media
The film was released on DVD by CBS Home Entertainment on October 28, 2014.

See also
 The War of the Worlds, 1898 novel by H. G. Wells
 List of American films of 1975
 The Night America Trembled - the earlier dramatization. The cast included Alexander Scourby, Ed Asner, and Warren Oates. James Coburn made his television debut, and, in one of his earliest acting roles, Warren Beatty appeared in the bit part of a card-playing college student.

References

External links

Illustrated summary of The Night That Panicked America

1975 television films
1975 films
1975 drama films
American drama television films
Films about Orson Welles
Films about radio
Films based on The War of the Worlds
Films directed by Joseph Sargent
Films set in 1938
Films set in New Jersey
Films set in New York City
Films with screenplays by Nicholas Meyer
1970s English-language films